A lookout or look-out is a person on a ship in charge of the observation of the sea for hazards, other ships, land, etc..

Lookout may also refer to:

Observers and observation
Fire lookout, a person assigned the duty to look for fire from a high place, which might also be termed a lookout. See also:
Fire lookout tower
Lookout tree
Overlook (also known as a lookout), an observation spot

Places

Geographic features
Lookout Summit, a mountain in Washington, U.S.
The Lookout (Springfield Township), a summit in Pennsylvania, U.S.
Cape Lookout (disambiguation)
Lookout Mountain (disambiguation)
Point Lookout (disambiguation)

United States municipalities
Lookout, California
Lookout, Indiana
Lookout, Kentucky
Lookout, Pennsylvania
Lookout, West Virginia
Lookout, Wisconsin
Fort Lookout (Kansas)
Fort Lookout (Arkansas)

Arts, entertainment, and media

Films
The Lookout (1990 film), 1990 Israeli comedy film
The Lookout (2007 film), 2007 American crime film
The Lookout (2012 film), 2012 French crime film, directed by Michele Placido and starring Daniel Auteuil

Music
 The Lookout, 2018 album by Laura Veirs
 "Lookout", 2017 song by Ryan Adams from the album Prisoner: End of the World Edition

Other arts, entertainment, and media
Lookout! Records, American punk rock record label which existed 1987-2012
The Lookout,  the Lansing Community College student newspaper

Ships
Lookout (clipper), 1853 clipper ship in the San Francisco and West Coast lumber trades
HMS Lookout, two British Royal Navy ships 
USS Lookout (YAGR-2), U.S. Navy radar picket ship

Sports
Lookout (horse), an American Thoroughbred racehorse
Chattanooga Lookouts, a minor league baseball team

Other uses
Lookout (architecture), a structural element used in roof framing
Lookout Air Raids, the minor but unique bombing air raid against US mainland during World War II

See also
Look Out (disambiguation)
Lookouts (disambiguation)